The II Fallschirmkorps (2nd Parachute Corps) was created in 1943 from Division Meindl an experienced division on the Eastern Front. In the wake of this new Corps, the 3rd and 5th Fallschirmjägerdivision were raised and attached to the Corps. A year later the Corps was almost completely annihilated while fighting in the Falaise Pocket during the Battle for Normandy. The II Fallschirmkorps was later refitted with replacement troops provided by Fallschirm-Jäger-Ersatz-Battalion 2 and sent to aid the 1st Fallschirm-Armee until their surrender to the Allies in 1945. Under the command of the Werner E. Kranz.

Commanding officer
 Generalleutnant Eugen Meindl, 5 November 1943 – 5 May 1945

Organisation
September 1944
3rd Fallschirmjägerdivision
Fallschirmjäger Aufklarungs Abteilung 3 
Fallschirmjäger Regiment 5
I Battalion
Fallschirmjäger Regiment 8
I Battalion
Fallschirmjäger Regiment 9
I Battalion
Abteilung Isphording
Fallschirmjäger Artillerie Regiment 3 
 Battalions I-III
Fallschirmjäger Panzerjäger Battalion 3
Fallschirmjäger Pioneer Abteilung 3
Fallschirmjäger FlaK Abteilung 3
5th Fallschirmjägerdivision
Fallschirmjäger Regiment 13
Fallschirmjäger Regiment 14
Fallschirmjäger Regiment 15
Battalions I-III
Fallschirmjäger FlaK Abteilung 5
Fallschirmjäger Artillerie Regiment 5
Kampfgruppe Greshick
Battalions I-III
Fallschirmjäger FlaK

References

Airborne units and formations of Germany
Patachute,02
Military units and formations established in 1943
Military units and formations disestablished in 1945